Jess Gardner (born 28 May 1985) is an Australian rules footballer who played for the Western Bulldogs in the AFL Women's competition. Gardner was drafted by the Western Bulldogs with their 17th selection and 131st overall in the 2016 AFL Women's draft. She made her debut in the thirty-two point win against  at VU Whitten Oval in the opening round of the 2017 season. She played five matches in her debut season and kicked one goal. She was delisted at the conclusion of the 2017 season.

References

External links 

1985 births
Living people
Western Bulldogs (AFLW) players
Australian rules footballers from Victoria (Australia)
Victorian Women's Football League players